Havering London Borough Council in London, England is elected every four years. Since the last boundary changes in 2002, 54 councillors have been elected from 18 wards.

Political control
The first election to the council was held in 1964, initially operating as a shadow authority ahead of the new system coming into full effect the following year. Political control of the council since 1964 has been held by the following parties:

Leadership

The role of mayor in Havering is largely ceremonial, usually being held by a different councillor each year. Political leadership is instead provided by the leader of the council. The leaders since 1965 have been:

Council elections
 1964 Havering London Borough Council election
 1968 Havering London Borough Council election
 1971 Havering London Borough Council election
 1974 Havering London Borough Council election
 1978 Havering London Borough Council election (boundary changes increased the number of seats by eight)
 1982 Havering London Borough Council election
 1986 Havering London Borough Council election
 1990 Havering London Borough Council election
 1994 Havering London Borough Council election (boundary changes took place but the number of seats remained the same)
 1998 Havering London Borough Council election
 2002 Havering London Borough Council election (boundary changes reduced the number of seats by nine) 
 2006 Havering London Borough Council election
 2010 Havering London Borough Council election
 2014 Havering London Borough Council election
 2018 Havering London Borough Council election
 2022 Havering London Borough Council election

Borough result maps

By-election results

1964-1968
There were no by-elections.

1968-1971

1971-1974

1974-1978

1978-1982

1982-1986

1986-1990

1990-1994

The by-election was called following the resignation of Cllr. Sean L. Willis.

The by-election was called following the resignation of Cllr. Mark A. Flewitt.

The by-election was called following the resignation of Cllr. Alice E. Smith.

The by-election was called following the resignation of Cllr. William A. Remfry.

1994-1998
There were no by-elections.

1998-2002

The by-election was called following the death of Cllr. Norman F. Symonds.

The by-election was called following the death of Cllr. Ruby M. Latham.

2002-2006

The by-election was called following the resignation of Cllr. Brian M. Clarke.

The by-election was called following the resignation of Cllr. Wayne A. Redgrave.

2006-2010

The by-election was called following the resignation of Cllr. Brenda J. Riddle.

The by-election was called following the death of Cllr. Edward Cahill.

The by-election was called following the resignation of Cllr. Alan H. Bailey.

The by-election was called following the death of Cllr. Leonard F. Long.

The by-election was called following the resignation of Cllr. David G. Charles.

2010-2014

The by-election was called following the death of Cllr. Dennis R. Bull.

2014-2018

The by-election was triggered by the resignation of Councillor Phillip Hyde (Independent, elected as UK Independence Party)

References

External links
 Havering Council